Román Gómez (born 6 July 1947) is a Mexican former fencer. He competed in the individual and team foil and team sabre events at the 1968 Summer Olympics.

References

External links
 

1947 births
Living people
Mexican male foil fencers
Olympic fencers of Mexico
Fencers at the 1968 Summer Olympics
Fencers from Mexico City
Pan American Games medalists in fencing
Pan American Games bronze medalists for Mexico
Fencers at the 1971 Pan American Games
Mexican male sabre fencers
20th-century Mexican people